Nová Ves v Horách is a municipality and village in Most District in the Ústí nad Labem Region of the Czech Republic. It has about 500 inhabitants.

Administrative parts
Villages of Lesná, Mikulovice and Mníšek are administrative parts of Nová Ves v Horách.

References

Villages in Most District
Czech Republic–Germany border crossings
Villages in the Ore Mountains